Monique Adolphe (23 July 1932, Paris – 27 June 2022, Paris, France) is a French scientist and researcher into the field of cell biology. She was one of the pioneers of cell culture in vitro and its applications in alternatives to animal testing. She is an Officier de la Légion d'honneur and has received several other important decorations and distinctions (see below).

Biography
After her pharmacological internship at the Hôtel-Dieu de Paris under Jean Cheymol's supervision in the 1950s, Monique Adolphe orientated, in 1960, her researches in the field of cell culture. With Paul Lechat she was an ardent advocate of alternative methods to animal testing by promoting the use of in vitro techniques, while recognising the limits of these methods.

Much of her research career has been devoted to the study of cartilage and chondrocyte biology. As Research Director of the Laboratory of Cellular Pharmacology of the École pratique des hautes études until 1997, she trained dozens of young scientists in cell culture methods. In 1986 she founded the Société de pharmaco-toxicologie cellulaire ("Society of Cellular Pharmaco-Toxicology") (SPTC).

From 1990 to 1994 she was president of the École pratique des hautes études. On 7 January 2009 she became Chair of the Académie Nationale de Pharmacie ("National Academy of Pharmacy") for one year—the first woman to hold this position since the Academy was created in 1803.

Honours
 Member of the Académie Nationale de Médecine (elected 2001)
 Honorary member of the National Academy of Pharmacy (elected in 1984, Honorary since 2002); Vice-President since March 2008; Chair since January 2009
 Honorary member of the European Society for Toxicology in Vitro 
 Foreign honorary member of the Académie royale de médecine de Belgique
 Honorary President of the Society of cellular pharmaco-toxicology
 Honorary President of the European Society of tissue culture
 Officier de la Legion of Honour
 Commander of the Order of Merit
 Commandeur des Palmes Académiques

Bibliography
Translator's note: Many of these works are in French.
Pharmacologie moléculaire, Yves Cohen with Monique Adolphe (et al.), ed. Masson, 1978.
Advances in Physiological Sciences, Vol. 10: Chemotherapy, Monique Adolphe, Publisher: Franklin Book Company, Inc, 1979. .
Culture de cellules animales, Monique Adolphe and Georgia Barlovatz-Meimon, ed. INSERM, 1987.
Méthodes in vitro en pharmaco-toxicologie, Monique Adolphe and André Guillouzo, ed. INSERM, 1988, .
Biological Regulations of the Chondrocytes, Monique Adolphe, Publisher: CRC Pr Llc, 1992. .
Culture de cellules animales, Georgia Barlovatz-Meimon and Monique Adolphe, ed. INSERM, 2003. .

References
Translator's note: These are in French.

External links
Translator's note: These are in French.
Monique Adolphe sur le site officiel de l'Académie nationale de pharmacie

Scientists from Paris
Living people
French women biologists
French pharmacologists
1932 births
Officiers of the Légion d'honneur
Academic staff of the École pratique des hautes études
Commanders of the Ordre national du Mérite
Commandeurs of the Ordre des Palmes Académiques
Women pharmacologists
University of Paris alumni